All About Chemistry is the third and most recent studio album by American rock band Semisonic, released on March 13, 2001, through MCA Records. With this release, the band failed, at least in America, to capitalize on the momentum it had generated with the song "Closing Time" from their previous album, Feeling Strangely Fine. This had a softer edge than Feeling Strangely Fine and was not as popular with the fans. By 2002, the album had sold 58,000 copies, and its poor sales partially led to the band going on an unofficial hiatus. However, it has a five star rating by Q Magazine. The track "Chemistry" was featured on the soundtrack for 40 Days and 40 Nights.

The song "One True Love" was co-written by the band's singer/guitarist, Dan Wilson and music legend Carole King. The song "Get a Grip" is an ode to masturbation. The title track was included on the album "Nolee Mix" which was released to promote the My Scene dolls.

The special edition of the album features cover art with orange (or pink in the UK) fluid in the vials instead of the blue fluid of the original. It includes two bonus tracks, "Girlfriend" and "Ordinary Life"; instead of being tacked onto the end, they appear between "Get a Grip" and "Surprise."

Critical reception
Q listed All About Chemistry as one of the best 50 albums of 2001.

Track listing
All songs written by Dan Wilson, except where noted.

Charts

Personnel
 Dan Wilson – vocals, guitars, piano, keyboards
 John Munson – bass, piano, keyboards, trombone
 Jacob Slichter – drums, piano, keyboards

Guest musicians
 Ken Chastain – congas on "Act Naturally", darbuca on "Sunshine & Chocolate", Korg WaveDrum on "I Wish", tabla on "El Matador"
 Carole King – vocals, electric piano on "One True Love"
 Matt Wilson – additional vocals, synth on "Bed"
 John Fields – synths, loops, bass on "Sunshine & Chocolate"
 Gary Louris – guitar solo on "I Wish"
 Shane Washington – french horn on "Surprise"

References

External links
 

Semisonic albums
2001 albums
MCA Records albums
Albums produced by Dan Wilson (musician)